Codonanthopsis calcarata is a species of flowering plant in the family Gesneriaceae. This species is native to Bolivia, Brazil North, Brazil West-Central, Colombia, French Guiana, Guyana, Suriname, and Venezuela. Codonanthopsis calcarata is an epiphyte, and mainly grows in wet tropical biomes. Codonanthopsis calcarata was first published in 2013.

References

Gesnerioideae